Kidnap is an upcoming Sri Lankan Sinhala action thriller film directed by Suranga de Alwis and co-produced by Suranga De Alwis himself for Sangeetha Films and Arjuna Kamalanath for Isuru Films. It stars Arjuna Kamalanath and Dulani Anuradha in lead roles along with Mahendra Perera and Buddhika Jayaratne. Music composed by Sarath de Alwis.

The film was initially ready to screen on 28 March 2018 which was later delayed. This film is a remake of 2016 Telugu film Kshanam.

Plot

Cast
 Dulani Anuradha as Police officer Kavya 
 Buddhika Jayarathne as Police officer Jaye
 Arjuna Kamalanath as	Waruna
 Mahendra Perera as Upali
 Dananjaya Siriwardana as Suda
 Ameesha Kavindi as Nisansala
 D.B. Gangodathenna		
 Rajitha Hiran Chamikara		
 Isuru Lokuhettiarachchi		
 Mark Samson
 Harshana Bethmage		
 Jayarathna Galagedara		
 Dilki Mihiraji		
 Anura Bandara Rajaguru
 Shiromika Fernando
 Kumudu Nishantha
 Manel Wanaguru
 Rohani Weerasinghe
 Ashen shavinda

References

External links
 
 Gajaman on YouTube

Sinhala-language films
Films directed by Suranga de Alwis